The 2007 Campeonato Nacional Apertura Copa Banco del Estado  was the 81st Chilean League top flight tournament, in which Colo-Colo won its 26th league title.

Teams

Stadia

League table

Rules for classification: 1st points; 2nd wins; 3rd goal difference; 4th goals scored; 5th away goals; 6th red cards; 7th yellow cards; 8th draw.

Top goalscorers

Pre-Copa Sudamericana play-off

Audax Italiano & Colo-Colo qualified for the 2007 Copa Sudamericana

References

External links
 RSSSF Chile 2007

Primera División de Chile seasons
Chile
2007 in Chilean football